Aïn Abid is a district in Constantine Province, Algeria. It was named after its capital, Aïn Abid.

Municipalities
The district is further divided into 2 municipalities:
Aïn Abid
Ben Badis

Districts of Constantine Province
Populated places in Constantine Province